The Focke-Wulf Fw 62 was a reconnaissance floatplane, designed and built by Focke-Wulf for use by Nazi Germany's Kriegsmarine. Only four were built.

Design and development

In 1936 the RLM, the German ministry of aviation, formulated a requirement for a shipboard seaplane for reconnaissance missions, to replace the Heinkel He 114. The aircraft was to be light, with a maximum weight of 2.5 tons and a crew of one or two, and suitable for catapult launching. Equipment and armament were to be kept to a minimum.

Focke-Wulf competed with the Fw 62, a conventional biplane design. The Fw 62 was of mixed construction and powered by a 705 kW (945 hp) BMW 132K radial engine. The engine was tightly cowled and drove a two-bladed propeller. The biplane wings were of equal span and featured two N-type struts on each side. They could be folded for shipboard storage. Each wing had a plain flap and an aileron.

Operational history
First flown on 23 October 1937 the Fw 62 V1 twin floats, while the Fw 62 V2 had a large central float and smaller outboard stabilising floats. Official tests began in Travemünde in the summer of 1937. The Fw 62 was a capable aircraft and well liked by test pilots, but the competing Arado Ar 196 monoplane was both conceptually and structurally more modern, and was chosen for production.

Specifications (Fw 62 V1)

See also

References

External links

 Focke Wulf Fw 62 Reconnaissance at Luftwaffe Of The Reich

Aircraft first flown in 1937
Biplanes
Floatplanes
Fw 062
1940s German military reconnaissance aircraft
Single-engined tractor aircraft